Lectionary 183, designated by siglum ℓ 183 (in the Gregory-Aland numbering) is a Greek manuscript of the New Testament, on parchment, written in uncial letters. Westcott and Hort labelled it by 38e, Scrivener by 257e. Paleographically usually it has been assigned to the 10th century. The manuscript has some lacunae at the end and inside, but they were supplied by a later hand. It is faded in parts.

Textually it often agrees with old uncial manuscript of the New Testament, but it has some unique variants. It has numerous errors, but unequally distributed in the codex. It was examined by several palaeographers.

It forms part of the British Library Arundel Manuscripts.

Description 

The codex contains Lessons from the Gospels of John, Matthew, Luke lectionary (Evangelistarium), on 329 parchment leaves (29.4 cm by 23.2 cm). 9 leaves of the original codex were lost, but they were supplied by a later hand on paper.
The codex contains all the Church lessons from Easter to Pentecost, for every Saturday and Sunday for the rest of the year.

The leaf with text of John 20:19–30 is on paper, part of the first leaf (John 1:11–13) is on paper and was supplied by later hand.
The supplied leaves are also written in uncial letters, but in a widely in different style, "with thicker downstrokes and very thin upstrokes".

It contains music notes and portraits of the Evangelists in colours and gold before each Gospel (folios 1v, 63v, 94v, and 131v). There are 16 headpieces  in colours and gold. According to Scrivener it is splendidly illuminated. The decorations are zoomorphic (birds, fishes) or anthropomorphic (human figures, hands, other body parts), also harpies, or vases.

The text is written in Greek uncial letters, in two columns per page, 22 lines per page. The margins are wide, the text measures 24.5 by 16.5 cm. The first page is in red and gold, the rest pages in black ink, much faded in parts. The handwriting is large and elegant. The large initial letters are rubricated, the headpieces are decorated in colours and gold  (folios 1r, 64r, 95r, 132r, and 238r). The small initials in red ink. The breathings (rough breathing, smooth breathing), and accents in red, they are given correctly, without any pretensions to correctness. The words are written continuously without any separation. The nomina sacra are written in an abbreviated way.

The itacistic error occurs very frequently, much often than in Codex Alexandrinus, and almost so frequently as in Codex Bezae, but they are unequally distributed over the different parts of the manuscript. The change ι into ει is not so perpetual as in these two manuscripts. There is no iota adscriptum or iota subscriptum in the codex. N ephelkystikon occurs almost constantly. According to Scrivener the grammatical forms of the manuscript usually are considered as Alexandrian.

There are many marks in red ink, some erasures and corrections made by a later hand. A few corrections were made by modern hand.

Text 

The text of the codex is a representative of the Byzantine text-type and it is closer to the Textus Receptus than many other manuscript of much later date, but some readings of the codex can be found in the uncial manuscripts: Alexandrinus, Vaticanus, Ephraemi recriptus, Bezae, Cyprius, Regius, and Campianus. It agrees with these manuscripts in following texts: Matthew 6:32; 7:2.12.13; 8:18; 9:22.27; 18:14; 22:13; 23:10.25;27.28; 24:6; 26:71; 27:41.45; Mark 1:9; 13:9; 16:9; Luke 1:65; 2:25; 3:16; 4:16.25; 9:31.33; 12:7.8.11.12; 18:21.43; 22:47; 23:15.28.38.48; 24:10; John 12:34; 13:2; 19:27.

It has also a number of unique readings in following texts: Matthew 2:15; 3:16; 9:10; 17:17; 20:5; 23:35; 24:4.42.43; 27:1.56; Mark 1:7; 6:8.10.16; 12:30.32; 13:11; 15:26.33; Luke 7:24.28; John 1:29; 7:41; 8:44; 12:20.35.47; 15:8; 18:33.

 Textual variants
The words after the brackets are the readings of the codex.
 Matthew 2:15 – ινα ] οπως
 Matthew 3:16 – εμεινεν ] ερχομενον
 Matthew 9:10 – πολλοι ] πολλαι
 Matthew 17:17 – φερετε μοι αυτον ωδε ] φερετε αυτον προς με
 Matthew 20:5 – ωσαυτως ] ωσαυτος
 Matthew 23:35 – ελθη ] επελθη
 Matthew 24:4 – μη τις υμας πλανηση ] μη πλανηθηναι
 Matthew 24:42 – γρηγορειτε ] γρηγορειται
 Matthew 24:43 – φυλακη ] φυλακει

History 

Josiah Forshall, palaeographer, dated the manuscript to the 9th century (Catalogue of Manuscripts in the British Museum, 1834–1840). Scrivener stated that on the palaeographical ground it should be dated earlier, even to the 7th or 8th century, but liturgical books usually were written in an older letters than in other documents. Scrivener dated this manuscript to the 9th century. Gregory refers the manuscript even later, to the 10th century. It has been assigned by the Institute for New Testament Textual Research to the 10th century.

Place of origin is unknown. It has been suggested Eastern Mediterranean (Cappadocia?) or South Italy. According to the subscription it was written in the "monastery of the Holy Trinity on the island of Chalce".

The manuscript once belonged to Thomas Howard (1585–1646), 2nd earl of Arundel, 4th earl of Surrey, and 1st earl of Norfolk, art collector and politician; probably he acquired the manuscript by his agents Petty or Thomas Roe in 1626. Then it belonged to Henry Howard (1628–1684), 6th duke of Norfolk, who presented the manuscript to the "Royal Society" in London in 1667 (along with Minuscule 476 and Lectionary 187). It was later purchased by the British Museum from the Royal Society along with more than 500 other Arundel manuscripts in 1831. Since 1973 it is housed in the British Library.

The manuscript was examined by Richard Bentley, who made the first partial collation of the codex. The collation of Bentley is still preserved at the Trinity College (B. XVII. 8). Scrivener made its new "exact and full" collation in 1852 (together with the ℓ 184). It was published in 1853. Scrivener stated: "I regard Codex x – Lectionary 183 – as perhaps the most valuable manuscript I have collated."

The manuscript was not known for Johann Martin Augustin Scholz and it was not catalogued in his list. It was added to the list of New Testament manuscripts by Scrivener (number 257e) and Caspar René Gregory (number 183e). Gregory saw the manuscript in 1884. Brooke Foss Westcott and Fenton Hort labelled it by 38e.

It was examined by Walter de Gray Birch and Henry Jenner, E. Maunde Thompson, J. A. Herbert, John Bradley, Kurt Weitzmann, and David Buckton. Gregory saw the manuscript in 1883. William Hatch edited one facsimile page of the codex.

The codex was rebound and renovated in 1963.

The manuscript is sporadically cited in the critical editions of the Greek New Testament (UBS3). It is not cited in UBS4.

The codex is located in the British Library (Arundel 547) at London.

See also 

 List of New Testament lectionaries
 Biblical manuscript
 Textual criticism
 Minuscule 71

Notes and references

Bibliography 

 
 Westcott in Catalogue of ancient Manuscripts in the British Museum, 1881. 
 William Hatch, The Principal Uncial Manuscripts of the New Testament (Chicago, 1939), LXXIV.

External links 

 Arundel 547 at the British Library

Greek New Testament lectionaries
10th-century biblical manuscripts
British Library Arundel collection